Nemophora dumerilella is a moth of the Adelidae family. It is found in most of Europe, except Ireland, Great Britain, the Netherlands, Portugal, Italy, Slovenia, Croatia, Lithuania, Latvia, Estonia, Finland and Norway.

Adults are on wing in July.

The larvae feed on Hieracium and Hypericum species.

References

External links
lepiforum.de
Species info at nkis.info

Moths described in 1839
Adelidae
Moths of Europe
Moths of Asia